The Deputy Comptroller of the Navy was a principal member of the Navy Board of the  Royal Navy who was responsible for  chairing the Committee of Correspondence and managing all internal and external communications of the Navy Board from 1793 to 1816 and then again from 1829 to 1832. He was based at the Navy Office.

History
The post of the Deputy Comptroller of the Navy was created in 1793 primarily to relive the Comptroller of the Navy of some of his duties. In 1796 the offices of Clerk of the Acts and the three Comptrollers of Accounts (stores, victualling, treasurers) were abolished following an internal inquiry and audit of the Navy Boards business the Board reconstituted and then placed under the supervision of three Committees, for Correspondence, Accounts and Stores. The deputy comptroller was appointed Chairman of the Committee of Correspondence whose members included the former Clerk of the Acts, the Surveyor of the Navy and the commissioner for the Transport Service. Also in attendance at meetings was the Secretary to the Navy Board. The post was temporarily suspended in 1816, then left vacant until 1829 it then existed until 1832 when the Navy Board was abolished and its functions were merged with the Board of Admiralty's.

List of deputy comptrollers
Included:
 Captain Edward Le Cras, 11 February 1793 – 20 December 1793
 Captain Sir Andrew Snape Hamond, 7 March 1794 – 24 September 1794
 Captain Sir Samuel Marshall, 25 September 1794 – 2 October 1795
 Captain Charles Hope, 21 October 1795 – 20 January 1801
 Henry Duncan, 21 January 1801 – 19 June 1806
 Sir Robert Barlow, 20 June 1806 – 2 December 1808
 Sir Francis Hartwell, Bt, 3 December 1808 – 21 August 1814
 Captain William Shield, 22 August 1814 – December 1814
 Sir Thomas Byam Martin, January 1815 – February 1816
Note: the post was temporarily suspended and left vacant
 Hon. Henry Legge, 4 May 1829 – 20 October 1830
 Hon. Robert Dundas, 21 October 1830 – 1832

References

Sources
 Clowes. Laird. William. (1899), The Royal Navy, A History from the Earliest Times to Present, Volume IV, Sampson Lowe Marston and Co, London.
 Office-Holders in Modern Britain: Volume 7, Navy Board Officials 1660-1832, ed. J M Collinge (London, 1978), British History Online http://www.british-history.ac.uk/office-holders/vol7 [accessed 9 June 2017].

External links

D